Paratephritis takeuchii is a species of tephritid or fruit flies in the genus Paratephritis of the family Tephritidae.

Distribution
Japan.

References

Tephritinae
Insects described in 1949
Diptera of Asia